Pierrick Boyer (born 22 July 1974 in Valognes) is a French pastry chef. He moved to Australia in 2003 and was appointed Pastry Chef at RACV. He opened Le Petit Gateau Patisserie in July 2007. In 2017, he was awarded the Gault & Millau Pastry Chef of the Year. He left the Executive Pastry Chef position at RACV City Club and opened the Pierrick Boyer Cafe and Patisserie in May 2018.

Career
In 1997, Pierrick was recruited from a French patisserie in Palm Springs. In 2002, Boyer joined the pastry department of the Ritz Carlton in Boston. Boyer worked for 14 months at the Plaza Athenee in Paris as Sous Pastry Chef, under Christophe Michalak before joining the RACV City Club in Melbourne. He appeared at the Cake Bake & Sweets Show 2015 in Sydney and Melbourne and at Regional Tastes Festival at Eynesbury in 2016.

Awards
In 2017, he was awarded the Gault & Millau Pastry Chef of the Year award.

Charity work
He is an ambassador of RSPCA Victoria. He was featured in the inaugural Asia In South Australia 2015 Charity Dinner and Sakai in Ginza Miyako Charity Dinner.

References

Living people
1974 births
Pastry chefs
French chefs
People from Manche